Atef Ben Hassine (born on 17 August 1974 in Chebba ) is a Tunisian actor and director.

Filmography

Theater

Cinema

Television

References

External links

Tunisian male film actors
People from Tunis
1974 births
Living people
21st-century Tunisian male actors